Tsosie is a surname, derived from the Navajo word , meaning "slender" or "slim" and may refer to:

Ernie Tsosie, half of the Navajo comedy duo James & Ernie
Krystal Tsosie, Navajo geneticist
Leonard Tsosie (born 1955), American politician
Myron Tsosie, American politician
Ellavina Tsosie Perkins, Navajo linguist
Steven T. Plummer (Steven Tsosie Plummer) (1944-2005), first Navajo bishop of the Episcopal Church
Frank Tsosie Thompson (1920-2008), Navajo code talker

Native American surnames
Navajo language